Jon or John Russ may refer to:

Sports personalities
John Russ (baseball) (1858–1912), American outfielder and pitcher
John Russ (American football) (before 1880–after 1906), American college football coach
John Russ, American player on 2013 Mercer Bears football team#Awards

Others
John Russ (politician) (1767–1833) American member of Congress from Connecticut
John Dennison Russ (1801–1881), American physician
Jon Russ, American composer; music for 2005's Moon Mary (Brownbrokers#Notable past productions)

See also 
Jon-Russ Jaggesar (born 1986), Trinidadian cricketer
Jonathan Russell (disambiguation)
John Russell (disambiguation)
John Russo (disambiguation)
John Ross (disambiguation)